"You Wouldn't Know" is a song written by Barry Gibb which was recorded by the Bee Gees and released as the B-side of their version of "Everyday I Have to Cry" and later included on the album The Bee Gees Sing and Play 14 Barry Gibb Songs (1965). The album of the same name was released in Europe by Tring Records and features the Bee Gees songs from 1963 to 1966.

Recording and structure
It was recorded in February 1965 around the same time as "Everyday I Have to Cry". The version of this song on Brilliant from Birth (1998) is faded 7 seconds early at 1:59 and you can hear Robin Gibb shouting and laughing on the fadeout. It was the first song on which Maurice Gibb is credited playing organ.

The song starts with a guitar strumming, the riff and an organ and then Barry starts to sing the line "Come a bit close to me, let me be kissed, Come on and give to me what I have missed, I love you women, I know that I'll get you somehow". And then Robin and Maurice sing harmony on the chorus: "You wouldn't know if I hadn't told you so, You wouldn't know if I hadn't told you so, oh".

Personnel
 Barry Gibblead vocal, guitar
 Robin Gibbharmony and backing vocal
 Maurice Gibbharmony and backing vocal, organ, guitar
 Uncrediteddrums, bass guitar

References

Bee Gees songs
1965 songs
Songs written by Barry Gibb